This is a list of Assamese languages films released in the decade of the 1950s. There were 19 movies were released in this decade.

Films

References

External links

rupaliparda.com, an Assamese film website
 http://www.brahmaputravalleyfilmfestival.com

Assamese
1950s
Assamese